Nottleben is a municipality in the district of Gotha, in Thuringia, Germany.

References

Municipalities in Thuringia
Gotha (district)